Tibor Kopacz (17 April 1962 – 9 May 2009) was a Romanian speed skater. He competed in two events at the 1984 Winter Olympics.

References

1962 births
2009 deaths
Romanian male speed skaters
Olympic speed skaters of Romania
Speed skaters at the 1984 Winter Olympics
Sportspeople from Miercurea Ciuc